Barnaul is the name of several inhabited localities in Russia.

Urban localities
Barnaul, a city Altai Krai, administratively incorporated as a city of krai significance; 

Rural localities
Barnaul, Kurgan Oblast, a village in Mostovskoy Selsoviet of Vargashinsky District in Kurgan Oblast;